"Good Lovin'" is a song by American R&B recording artist Slim, released as the second single from his debut album, Love's Crazy. The song features vocals from American rapper Fabolous and American singer Ryan Leslie, the latter of which also handled the song's production.

Music video 
The music video, filmed in New York City, was directed by Vashtie Kola. On November 19, 2008 a behind-the-scenes video was released where Slim described the video as "a 1930s, 1940s style". The video was released on November 20, 2008.

Other versions
American singer-songwriter Ciara, recorded her own rendition of the song to promote her then-upcoming album Fantasy Ride (2009). The rendition features vocals from American rapper 50 Cent and the song was re-titled "Slow Down".

Charts

References 

2008 singles
Ryan Leslie songs
Fabolous songs
Song recordings produced by Ryan Leslie
Music videos directed by Vashtie Kola
Songs written by Ryan Leslie
2008 songs
Songs written by Fabolous
Asylum Records singles